Marcel Palonder (born 3 February 1964 in Humenné, Czechoslovakia) is a Slovak singer. He represented his country in the Eurovision Song Contest 1996 with the song "Kým nás máš". His song qualified from the semifinal, earning 36 points but in the final it placed 18th place with 19 points. The points to the Slovak entry were given by: Greece four points, Malta eight points, Poland five points and Spain two points.

He attempted to represent his country once again at Eurovision in 2010, when he competed in the Slovak quarter-finals of Eurosong 2010 with the song "What About You", but failed reaching the semi-finals.

See also
 The 100 Greatest Slovak Albums of All Time

References

Living people
Eurovision Song Contest entrants for Slovakia
Eurovision Song Contest entrants of 1996
20th-century Slovak male singers
People from Humenné
1964 births
21st-century Slovak male singers